Hirtella carinata, also known as the hairy hillstream pleco, is a species of armored catfish endemic to Brazil. It occurs in the Rio Panelão, Rio Pardo and Rio Panelinha basins in Brazil. The species reaches 4.9 cm (1.9 inches) in standard length. It is the only known member of its genus.

References

Fish of South America
Taxa named by Roberto Esser dos Reis
Fish described in 2014
Loricariidae